Yvon Vallières (born February 5, 1949 in Richmond, Quebec) is a Quebec politician and teacher. He was a Member of National Assembly of Quebec for the riding of Richmond in the Estrie region from 1973 to 1976 and from 1981 to 2012. Formerly the Minister of Agriculture, Fisheries and Food from 2003 to 2007, he is the current Chair of the Government Caucus. He was a member of the Quebec Liberal Party.

Education

Vallières went to the Université de Sherbrooke and obtained a bachelor's degree in pedagogy and would teach at several schools from 1970 to 1972 and from 1976 to 1981 while being a councilor at the Commission Scolaire de Taillon in 1972. He also obtained a certificate in psychology human relations.

Professional and political career
Vallières would become the MNA for Richmond in 1973 when Robert Bourassa won a second majority term. Vaillieres was however defeated by the Parti Québécois in 1976 when they gain power for the first time ever under the leadership of René Lévesque. After returning to his teaching duties from 1976 to 1981, Vallières was a candidate again in Richmond for the 1981 elections and was re-elected. He was then named the President of the Agriculture, Fisheries and Food Parliamentary Commission. He was re-elected again in 1985 as the Liberals returned to power when Robert Bourassa returned to politics and became once again the party leader. Vallières would be named the Chief Whip of the government for the full mandate.

During his next mandate from 1989 to 1994, he was the Minister responsible or the delegate minister for several portfolios. He was named the Delegate Minister of Transport in 1989 and Delegate Minister of Regional development, Agriculture, Fisheries and Food from 1990 to 1992. He was also the Minister responsible of Fisheries from 1990 to 1994. When Daniel Johnson, Jr. replaced Bourassa during the final months of the Liberal Mandate, Vallieres was named once again the chief Whip of the government.

While the Liberals lost power in 1994, Vallières was re-elected for a fifth mandate and was named the opposition's critic in agriculture and regional development and was for the second time the President of the Agriculture, Fisheries and Food Parliamentary Commission. In 1998, he was re-elected for a sixth mandate and was again the opposition critic in agriculture until 2000. He was also the President of the Territorial Planning Parliamentary Commission.

When the Liberals regained power in 2003, Vallières, who won a seventh mandate was named for the third time the Chief Government Whip. After a Cabinet shuffle in 2005, he was named the Minister of Agriculture, Fisheries and Food until the 2007 elections. However, during his mandate, health issues forced him to take some time off and Laurent Lessard took over temporarily his duties. He was also briefly the Minister responsible of the Centre-du-Québec region after a minor Cabinet shuffle in 2006. Vallières won an eighth mandate but was removed from the Cabinet and named the Chair of the government Caucus.

On January 13, 2009 to April 2011, he was the President of the National Assembly of Quebec.

Electoral record (incomplete)

External links
 

Living people
Members of the Executive Council of Quebec
Presidents of the National Assembly of Quebec
Quebec Liberal Party MNAs
1949 births
Université Laval alumni
21st-century Canadian politicians